Kosmos 394 ( meaning Cosmos 394), also known as DS-P1-M No.2 is a satellite which was used to demonstrate technology for future satellites which would be used as targets for tests of anti-satellite weapons. It was launched by the Soviet Union in 1971 as part of the Dnepropetrovsk Sputnik programme. Following the completion of testing it was intercepted and destroyed by Kosmos 397 on 25 February.

Launch 
It was launched aboard a Kosmos-3M carrier rocket, from Site 132/1 at the Plesetsk Cosmodrome. The launch occurred at 18:48:48 UTC on 9 February 1971.

Orbit 
As of 2009, debris from its destruction is still in orbit.

Kosmos 394 was the second of the five original DS-P1-M satellites to be launched, and the first to successfully reach orbit. The three subsequent launches were all successful, before the satellite was replaced with a derivative, Lira. DS-P1-M and Lira satellites were used as targets for the Istrebitel Sputnikov programme.

See also

 1971 in spaceflight

References

1971 in spaceflight
1971 in the Soviet Union
Intentionally destroyed artificial satellites
Kosmos satellites
Spacecraft launched in 1971
Dnepropetrovsk Sputnik program